"If Looks Could Kill" is a song  written by Jack Conrad and Bob Garrett, originally recorded by Pamala Stanley and later by the rock band Heart in 1985. The Heart version was released as the fifth and final single from the band's self-titled 1985 album Heart. This version is similar to early Heart tunes as it is an aggressive, hard rock number.  The song is about a woman confronting a cheating lover, letting him know that "if looks could kill / you'd be lying on the floor".

After four top-ten U.S. singles (including the number-one "These Dreams") from the Heart album, "If Looks Could Kill" peaked at number 54 on the Billboard Hot 100.

Billboard said it's a "hard, fast and very excitable dance song."

Pamala Stanley's pop version was featured in the film Raw Deal in 1986. It also was recorded by the Norwegian actress and pop singer Mia Gundersen on her record Temptation in the same year.  A version of the song appeared in the 1985 telefilm Braker. German heavy metal band Primal Fear included a cover of the song on their 2017 collection Best of Fear.

Charts

References 

1985 songs
1986 singles
Capitol Records singles
Heart (band) songs
Song recordings produced by Ron Nevison
Songs written by Jack Conrad